Pykhovka is a rural locality (a selo) and the administrative center of Pykhovksoye Rural Settlement, Novokhopyorsky District, Voronezh Oblast, Russia. The population was 903 as of 2010. There are 11 streets.

Geography 
Pykhovka is located 13 km southwest of Novokhopyorsk (the district's administrative centre) by road. Novokhopyorsky is the nearest rural locality.

References 

Populated places in Novokhopyorsky District